Adelaide Hospital may refer to:

 Adelaide Hospital (Dublin) situated in Dublin, Ireland
 Adelaide Provincial Hospital (Eastern Cape) situated in Adelaide, Eastern Cape, South Africa
 Royal Adelaide Hospital in Adelaide, South Australia